Tomasz Zan (21 December 1796 Miasata, Vileysky Uyezd, Minsk Governorate, Russian Empire (now Belarus) – 19 July 1855 Kakoŭčyna, Orsha, Russian Empire), was a Polish and Belarusian poet and activist.

Biography
He was born on 21 December 1796 in Miasata, Vileysky Uyezd, in the Minsk Governorate of the Russian Empire (present-day Maladzyechna District of Belarus).

Zan attended the Vilnius University from 1820-1823, where he befriended Adam Mickiewicz, who would later become Poland's best-known poet. As Zan was two years older, he served as a mentor and friend to Mickiewicz.

In 1817 he was a cofounder of the Philomatic Association (Towarzystwo Filomatów), in 1820, Radiant Association (Towarzystwo Promienistych), in 1820-1823 president of Filaret Association (Zgromadzenie Filaretów), all of them student organizations in Vilnius dedicated to Polish cultural and political activities. For his activity in those organizations he was exiled by the Russian authorities to Siberia (from 1824 to 1837), during which time he assisted Alexander von Humboldt on his 1829 research expedition.

Between 1837 and 1841 he worked as a librarian in Saint Petersburg before returning to Vilnius.

He died on 19 July 1855 in Kakoŭčyna, Orsha, then part of the Russian Empire and is buried in the village of Smalany (present day Orsha District of Belarus).

Zan was the grandfather of the Polish poet Kazimiera Iłłakowiczówna.

Legacy
His poetry is mostly satirical, most known is the heroicomic 'Zgon tabakiery'.

References

External links

Z filareckiego świata:zbiór wspomnień z lat 1816-1824 by Henryk Mościcki http://kpbc.umk.pl/dlibra/doccontent?id=27328&dirids=1

1796 births
1855 deaths
People from Maladzyechna District
People from Vileysky Uyezd
Polish male poets
Polish exiles in the Russian Empire
Russian people of Polish descent
19th-century Polish poets
19th-century Polish male writers
Vilnius University alumni